Ivo Pešák (7 September 1944 – 9 May 2011) was a Czech singer, dancer, and comic performer.

Early life 
Pešák was born at Jaroměř, then in the Protectorate of Bohemia and Moravia.

Career 
He is perhaps best known for his work with Ivan Mládek, in the latter's Banjo Band, and particularly for his high-spirited performance in the viral video phenomenon, Jožin z Bažin. In Pešák's later years, he was in a group named Dýza Boys and he starred in a number of Czech films and television series.

He was a member of the rock'n'roll revival band known as the Rockec Ivo Pesaka.

References

1944 births
2011 deaths
Czechoslovak male singers
People from Jaroměř